The title Viscount Brackley has been created twice for members of the Egerton family; once in the Peerage of England and once in the Peerage of the United Kingdom.

The first creation in the Peerage of England was in 1616 for Thomas Egerton, 1st Baron Ellesmere (1540–1617), who had been created 1st Baron Ellesmere in 1603. He died a year later and his barony and viscountcy merged with the earldom of Bridgewater, which was created for his son, John Egerton. The earldom had been meant for Thomas Egerton, but he died before he could receive it.

The second creation in the Peerage of the United Kingdom was in 1846 for Francis Egerton (1800–1857) as a subsidiary title of the earldom of Ellesmere. In 1963, the 5th Earl of Ellesmere (1915–2000) succeeded as Duke of Sutherland and the title of Viscount Brackley merged with the dukedom.

Viscounts Brackley, first Creation (1616)
Thomas Egerton, 1st Baron Ellesmere (1540–1617) (created Viscount Brackley)
John Egerton, 2nd Viscount Brackley (1579–1649) (created Earl of Bridgewater in 1617)
For further succession, see Earl of Bridgewater, second creation

Viscounts Brackley, second Creation (1846)
see Earl of Ellesmere

Extinct viscountcies in the Peerage of England
Viscountcies in the Peerage of the United Kingdom
Noble titles created in 1616
Noble titles created in 1846
Noble titles created for UK MPs